Viktor Bazhenov (born 6 August 1946) is a Soviet fencer. He won a silver medal in the team sabre event at the 1972 Summer Olympics.

References

1946 births
Living people
Soviet male fencers
Olympic fencers of the Soviet Union
Fencers at the 1972 Summer Olympics
Olympic silver medalists for the Soviet Union
Sportspeople from Omsk
Olympic medalists in fencing
Medalists at the 1972 Summer Olympics